2K11 may refer to:

 the year 2011
 2K11 Krug, Soviet and now Russian surface-to-air missile system
 Killuminati 2K11, 2011 mixtape by American hip-hop group Outlawz 
 Major League Baseball 2K11, 2011 video game
 NBA 2K11, 2010 video game
 NHL 2K11, 2010 video game